Jelendol is a settlement on the banks of the Tržič Bistrica River in the Municipality of Tržič in the Upper Carniola region of Slovenia. Until 1955 it was called Puterhof.

References

External links 

Jelendol at Geopedia

Populated places in the Municipality of Tržič